Augustus Frederick Lindley (呤唎 "Lin-Le") February 3, 1840 – March 29, 1873, was a mid-19th-century British adventurer and writer.

Biography
China
In 1859, Lindley was a young Royal Navy officer stationed in Hong Kong where he became betrothed to Marie, the daughter of the Portuguese consul at Macau. In 1860 he resigned his commission, taking a job as the executive officer of a trading steamer smuggling specie to the Taiping reform movement in Shanghai. He accepted a commission from Taiping general Li Xiucheng, and helped train their soldiers in British Army techniques, while Marie became a sniper. After her death, he returned to England.  In 1866, he wrote and published "Ti Ping Tien Kwoh: or the History of the Taiping Revolution" and included a dedication ：To Le-Siu-Cheng, the Chung-Wang, "Faithful Prince," Commander-in-Chief of the Ti-Ping forces, this work is dedicated if he be living; and if not, to his memory.

Battle of Jofoolzo—commanding Taiping's warships
In June 1863, Li Xiu-cheng commanded 250,000 troops to withdraw to Nanjing, when Taiping's warships took troops cross river, tough fighting between Taiping and Qing Army (Battle of Jofoolzo九洑洲決戰), Lindley was commander of Taiping's fleet and several times defeated Qing Army offensive and down many Qing  warships, but he was wounded and his wife Mary and friend Earl were killed in action at last. For merit Lindley was promoted colonel by the Taiping.

General Gordon
When Charles George Gordon returned to the UK, Lindley publicly castigated Gordon in the pages of The Times.

South Africa
In 1868, Lindley - with Roger Pocklington, the American brothers Will and Tom Ashwell, and Louis de Glon of Switzerland - landed at Durban to undertake a gold-hunting expedition in the Transvaal.  While no gold was found, the group travelled extensively among the Boer and the various black communities, and encountered many adventures.  Pocklington married a Potchefstroom girl, and settled there.  The Ashwells and de Glon took up farming in Natal; Will later was an associate of Cecil Rhodes in the consolidation of the Kimberly diamond mines.  Lindley returned to England, where he wrote "After Ophir, or, A Search For the South African Gold Fields".

References

External links 
 
 

1840 births
1873 deaths
Military leaders of the Taiping Rebellion
Royal Navy officers
English evangelicals
Military personnel from London
British expatriates in China
Royal Navy personnel of the Second Opium War
Burials at Kensal Green Cemetery